L-myc-1 proto-oncogene protein is a protein that in humans is encoded by the MYCL1 gene.

MYCL1 is a bHLH (basic helix-loop-helix) transcription factor implicated in lung cancer.

Interactions 

MYCL1 has been shown to interact with MAX.

References

Further reading

External links 
 

Transcription factors